Zoltán Supola (born 25 September 1970) is a Hungarian gymnast. He competed at the 1992 Summer Olympics, the 1996 Summer Olympics and the 2000 Summer Olympics.

References

1970 births
Living people
Hungarian male artistic gymnasts
Olympic gymnasts of Hungary
Gymnasts at the 1992 Summer Olympics
Gymnasts at the 1996 Summer Olympics
Gymnasts at the 2000 Summer Olympics
Sportspeople from Dunaújváros
European champions in gymnastics
20th-century Hungarian people